TWX may refer to:

 Teletypewriter Exchange Service, a telex system in the US and Canada
 TWX (magazine)
 Time Warner's stock ticker symbol